Melvyn Douglas Scott (26 September 1939 – August 1997) was an English professional footballer who played as a centre half in the Football League for Brentford and Chelsea. He was capped by England at youth and U23 level.

Club career

Chelsea 
A centre half, Scott began his career in the youth system at Chelsea and signed his first professional contract in November 1956. He broke into the first team squad late in the 1957–58 season and was a regular during 1958–59, making 38 appearances. Over the course of the 1959–60 and 1960–61 seasons, National Service reduced Scott's involvement to just 20 appearances and he came back into the team in 1961–62, making 37 appearances during a disastrous season in which Chelsea were relegated to the Second Division. He departed Stamford Bridge in March 1963, having made 104 appearances during six-and-a-half years as a professional with Chelsea.

Brentford 
Scott dropped down to the Fourth Division to join high-flying Brentford for a £12,500 fee in March 1963. During the remainder of the 1962–63 season he made 17 appearances, scored his first senior goal and won the first silverware of his career when the Bees were crowned Fourth Division champions in May 1963. Over the course of the following three Third Division seasons, Scott would prove to be an indispensable member of the team, making 146 appearances across the half back line, as full back cover and on one occasion as goalkeeper cover, late in a 5–1 victory over Oxford United in February 1966. He was voted the club's 1963–64 Supporters' Player of the Year. Brentford were relegated back to the Fourth Division in May 1966 and Scott lost the captaincy, which he had held since 1964. Despite being transfer-listed by the financially stricken club during 1966–67 season, Scott still experienced some success, with victory in the London Senior Cup. Scott was eventually released mid-season. During his time at Griffin Park, Scott made 177 appearances and scored two goals.

Oakland Clippers 
In 1967, Scott moved to the United States to join National Professional Soccer League club Oakland Clippers. He had a successful first season with the club, winning the Western Division and the league outright after a 4–2 aggregate victory over Baltimore Bays in the 1967 Final. Scott was also voted onto the National Professional Soccer League All-Star Team. The team experienced less joy in the North American Soccer League during its inaugural 1968 season, but Scott's performances were again recognised, with his inclusion in the league's All-Star Team. He departed the club at the end of the 1968 season and finished his two-season spell with 39 appearances and one goal.

International career 
Scott was capped by England at youth and U23 level.

Career statistics

Honours 
Brentford
 Football League Fourth Division: 1962–63
 London Challenge Cup: 1966–67
Oakland Clippers
 National Professional Soccer League: 1967
 National Professional Soccer League Western Division: 1967

Individual

 Brentford Supporters' Player of the Year: 1963–64
 National Professional Soccer League All-Star Team: 1967
 North American Soccer League All-Star Team: 1968

References

1939 births
English footballers
England under-23 international footballers
English expatriate footballers
Chelsea F.C. players
Brentford F.C. players
Oakland Clippers players
English Football League players
National Professional Soccer League (1967) players
North American Soccer League (1968–1984) players
1997 deaths
English expatriate sportspeople in the United States
Expatriate soccer players in the United States
Association football central defenders